The 2010 Ohio Valley Conference men's basketball tournament took place March 2, 5, and 6, 2010. The first round was hosted by the better seed in each game, and the semifinals and finals took place at Bridgestone Arena in Nashville, Tennessee.  The tournament was won by the #1 seed Murray State Racers, who received an automatic berth in the 2010 NCAA tournament.

Format
The top eight eligible men's basketball teams in the Ohio Valley Conference receive a berth in the conference tournament.  After the 20 game conference season, teams are seeded by conference record.  The winner earns an automatic berth in the 2010 NCAA tournament.  Had the #1 seed Murray State Racers failed to win the tournament, they would have received an automatic bid to the 2010 NIT.

Seeds

Only eight Ohio Valley schools will play in the tournament.  Teams are seeded by 2009–10 Ohio Valley Conference record, with a tiebreaker system to seed teams with identical conference records.

Through games of Feb. 17, 2010, the seeds would be as follows after implementing tiebreakers:

Bracket

External links
Official site of the Ohio Valley Conference
Official site of the Ohio Valley Conference tournament
Tournament Bracket

Tournament
Ohio Valley Conference men's basketball tournament
Basketball competitions in Nashville, Tennessee
College sports tournaments in Tennessee
Ohio Valley Conference men's basketball tournament
Ohio Valley Conference men's basketball tournament